The 1916 Montana gubernatorial election took place on November 7, 1916. Incumbent Governor of Montana Sam V. Stewart, who was first elected governor in 1912, ran for re-election. After comfortably winning the Democratic primary, he advanced to the general election, where he faced Frank J. Edwards, the former Mayor of Helena, who narrowly emerged victorious in a close Republican primary. Benefitting from then-President Woodrow Wilson's landslide victory in Montana in the presidential election that year, Stewart narrowly won re-election to his second and final term as governor.

Democratic primary

Candidates
Sam V. Stewart, incumbent Governor of Montana
Miles Romney Sr., former State Senator, former Mayor of Hamilton

Results

Republican primary

Candidates
Frank J. Edwards, former Mayor of Helena
Edward H. Cooney, Postmaster of Great Falls, former State Representative
Albert J. Galen, former Attorney General of Montana
Charles S. Henderson
Walter B. Sands
E. A. Gerhart
I. A. Leighton

Results

General election

Results

References

Montana
Gubernatorial
1916
November 1916 events